Most Ven. Matara Sri Nanarama Maha Thera (December 11, 1901 – April 30, 1992) (spelled Ñāṇārāma in Pali, sometimes called Gnanarama in Sinhala, Sinhala: අති පූජ්‍ය මාතර ශ්‍රී ඤාණාරාම මහා ථේර) was an influential Sri Lankan meditation master, scholar and forest monk of the 20th century.

Childhood
Dedduwa Jayathungage Don Bastian family of the Bajjima Village in Tikkannagoda (presently known as Uduwe) in the deep south of Sri Lanka was blessed with a child on 11 December 1901. Named as Don Dias Jayathunga, the devout parents offered this young child on his seventh birthday to the service of sasana under the tutelage of Ven Dedduwe Wimalajothi of Aliyatholla Temple, who was related to the family in his lay life.

Ordination
Young Jayathunga was ordained in December 1917 with the given name of Ven Matara Nanarama under the patronage of Ven Matale Aggadhammalankara Thera. Young samanera Nanarama was bent on perfecting his knowledge in dhamma pursued the dhamma education with utmost zeal. He received higher ordination on 10 July 1922 under Ven Sastrawelliye Upasena Nayaka Thera.

Bent on experiencing wisdom Ven. Nanarama gave up almost all mundane comforts for the sake of the final goal. Some nights he spent without a wink of sleep absorbed in the study of Suttas. Having mastered all the aspects of Tipitaka, Logics, Chandolankara, and other contemporary philosophies the young Nanarama pursued on the path to Nibbana with diligent practice.

Meditation Master
In 1951 the Most Venerable Kadawedduwe Jinavamsa Mahathera started a programme of activities for upholding the diminishing status of Sangha in Sri Lanka, and invited Ven Nanarama to head the program of the newly established Sri Kalyani Yogasrama Samstha. This organization was set up as an association of hundreds of forest monasteries throughout Sri Lanka of the Ramanna Nikaya ordination line. Young monks were properly trained in the monastic code, connections with the Burmese Sangha were intensified and meditation training was guided by Ven. Nanarama.

During the auspicious year of 2500 Buddha Jayanthi several Burmese meditation masters arrived in Sri Lanka. Ven Matara Nanarama Thera joined the retreats conducted by these excellent teachers at the Danawkande Sri Mangala Yogasramaya, and advanced rapidly on the path of insight meditation. Having observed the extra ordinary talent and zeal of Venerable Nanarama, the Burmese masters taught him every aspect of the practice and acknowledged his status as a Kammatthanacariya (Meditation teacher) in the Burmese Vipassana system.

Nissarana Vanaya

During this time another rare opportunity opened up for the advancement of sasana in Sri Lanka. The Buddhist philanthropist Asoka Weeraratna who selected a land and developed the forest hermitage at Meethirigala, called Nissarana Vanaya, was searching for a teacher to head this meditation center for Bhikkhus. Mr Weeraratna was able to persuade Venerable Nanarama Thera to take up this position. At this Nissarana Vanaya countless Bhikkus and lay devotees both local and foreign received instructions for their advancement on the path and many reaped benefit. Some of these instructions were recorded on tape and were made available in printed form as well. The recorded talks can be downloaded from the internet. Several books written based on the talks have been translated to western languages and have helped hundreds of seekers in the west.

A few years later Venerable Katukurunde Nanananda Thera, a former Pali lecturer at the University of Peradeniya joined Nissarana Vanaya and become one the closest disciples of Venerable Nanarama Thera. Other leading monks included Venerable Khemananda and Dhammajiva.

Venerable Sri Matara Nanarama Thera died on 30 April 1992 and the cremation took place on 7 May 1992 among thousands of devotees at the Galduwa Yogasrama premises.

See also 
 Kadawedduwe Jinavamsa Mahathera 
 Sri Kalyani Yogasrama Samstha
 Nissarana Vanaya

References

External links
The Seven Contemplations of Insight : Treatise on Insight Meditationa
Freed Freedom - a Fruitful Correspondence Between an Upasika and a Meditation Master
Freed Freedom
Ariya Desana - Dhamma Talks in Sinhala
Bhante Matara Sri Nanarama – The Seven Stages of Purification
Nissarana Vanaya Blog
Another Nissarana Vanaya Blog
Dhamma Talks by monks of Nissarana Vanaya
Sath Anupassana
Dhamma Talks
Dhamma Talks

1901 births
Buddhist monasticism
Monks
Sri Lankan Buddhist monks
Buddhist writers
1992 deaths
20th-century Buddhist monks